The 2008–09 Cleveland Cavaliers season was the 39th season of the franchise in the National Basketball Association (NBA). They finished the regular season with 66 wins and 16 losses, the best record in the NBA, which easily surpassed the previous franchise best of 57–25 from the 1988–89 and 1991–92 seasons. LeBron James won his first MVP Award. The Cavaliers had the fourth best team offensive rating and the second best team defensive rating in the NBA.

In the playoffs, the Cavaliers swept the Detroit Pistons in the First Round in four games, swept the Atlanta Hawks in the Semifinals in four games, before losing to the Orlando Magic in the Conference Finals in six games, despite the Cavaliers being heavily favored to beat the Magic. The Magic would go on to lose to the Los Angeles Lakers in the NBA Finals in five games. Prior to their elimination by the Magic, many had expected the Cavs to appear in the Finals, which would've also been LeBron and Kobe Bryant's first head-to-head meeting in the Finals.

Key dates
 June 26: The 2008 NBA draft took place in New York City.
 July 1: The [Free agency] period started.
 On October 7, the Cavaliers' pre-season began with an 84–104 loss to Toronto Raptors.
 On October 28, the Cavaliers' regular season started with an 85–90 loss at the Boston Celtics.
 On October 30, the Cavaliers beat the Charlotte Bobcats 96–79 for their first win in their home opener.
 On November 8, the Cavaliers beat the Chicago Bulls 106–97 to improve their record to 5-2 and take over first place in the Central Division.
 On November 18, the Cavaliers beat the New Jersey Nets 106–82 for their then season-high eighth straight win and improved their record to a then season high seven games over .500 (9-2).
 On December 3, the Cavaliers beat the New York Knicks 118–82 to set a franchise record by starting the season with ten straight home wins.
 On December 9, the Cavaliers beat the Toronto Raptors 114–94 to set an NBA record by winning nine straight games by 12 or more points.
 On December 12, the Cavaliers beat the Philadelphia 76ers 88–72 for their season best 11th straight win (which tied a franchise record), to improve to a then season high seventeen games over .500, their best 23 game start in franchise history (20-3), and to improve their franchise record by starting the season with thirteen straight home wins.
 On December 28, the Cavaliers beat the Miami Heat 93–86 to improve to a season high 22 games over .500, their best 30 game start in franchise history (26–4), and to improve their franchise record by starting the season with 16 straight home wins.
 On January 7, the Cavaliers beat the Charlotte Bobcats 111–81 for their best 34 game start in franchise history (28–6), to improve their franchise record by starting the season with 18 straight home wins, to take over first place in the Eastern Conference and to take a share of the best record in the NBA with the Los Angeles Lakers.
 On January 9, the Cavaliers beat the Boston Celtics 98–83 to improve to a season high 23 games over .500, their best 35 game start in franchise history (29–6), and to improve their franchise record by starting the season with 19 straight home wins.
 On January 23, the Cavaliers beat the Golden State Warriors 106–105 to improve to a season high 25 games over .500, their best 41 game start in franchise history (33–8).
 On February 3, the Cavaliers beat the Toronto Raptors 101–83 to get their franchise record 23rd straight home victory, and improved to 38–9 overall on the season.
 On February 8, the Cavaliers lost to the Los Angeles Lakers 91–101, their first home loss of the year, dropping to 23–1 at home and 39-10 overall on the season.
 On February 10, the Cavaliers lost to the Indiana Pacers 95–96, marking their first consecutive losses of the season.
 On March 2, the Cavaliers beat the Miami Heat 107–100, improving to 47-12 and marking the first time in franchise history the team was 35 games over .500.
 On March 4, the Cavaliers beat the Milwaukee Bucks 91–73, becoming the first team in the league to clinch a playoff berth.
 On March 13, the Cavaliers beat the Sacramento Kings 126–123, clinching the Central Division title: their first since the 1975–76 season and their second in franchise history.
 On March 19, the Cavaliers tied an NBA record by committing just 2 turnovers in a 97–92 overtime victory over the Portland Trail Blazers.
 On March 24, the Cavaliers beat the New Jersey Nets 98–87, improving their record to 58–13 and setting a franchise record for wins in a season.
 On March 31, the Cavaliers beat the Detroit Pistons 79–73, extending their winning streak to a new franchise record 13 wins in a row, setting a new franchise record and tying an NBA record for wins in any month by improving to 16–1 in March, and extending their franchise record for wins in a season, improving to 61–13.
 On April 10, the Cavaliers beat the Philadelphia 76ers 102–92, clinching the best record in the Eastern Conference for the first time in franchise history.
 On April 13, the Cavaliers beat the Indiana Pacers 117–109, clinching the best record in the NBA and home-court advantage throughout the playoffs, the first time ever the Cavaliers have done so.
 On April 15, the Cavaliers concluded their regular season with a 111–110 loss to the Philadelphia 76ers in OT. They finished the season 66–16, going 39–2 at home and 27–14 on the road. Their home record was the second-best in NBA history.
 On April 26, the Cavaliers advanced to the second round of the 2009 NBA Playoffs by defeating the Detroit Pistons four games to none.
 On May 9, the Cavaliers defeated the Atlanta Hawks 97–82 and became the first team in NBA history to win seven consecutive playoff games by a double-digit margin.
 On May 11, the Cavaliers defeated the Atlanta Hawks 84–74, earning a spot in the NBA Eastern Conference Finals. It was also the first time in franchise history they swept two consecutive playoff series.
 On May 30, the Cavs' season ended when they lost to the Orlando Magic in Game 6 of the Eastern Conference Finals, 103–90, in Orlando. The Magic took Game 1 in Cleveland with a 1-point victory and went on to win the series 4-2 before going on to lose to the Los Angeles Lakers 4–1 in the NBA Finals. 8 of the last 9 eastern conference No 1 seeded teams have been beaten in the Conference Finals.

Offseason
On June 26, 2008, the Cavaliers acquired the draft rights to forward Darnell Jackson from the Miami Heat in exchange for the lower of the Cavaliers two second-round picks in the 2009 NBA Draft. In addition, Cleveland purchased the rights to center Sasha Kaun from the Seattle SuperSonics.

On August 4, 2008, the Cavaliers signed Tarence Kinsey to a one-year contract.

On August 13, 2008, the Cavaliers traded Damon Jones and Joe Smith to the Milwaukee Bucks for Maurice Williams as part of a three-team, a six-player deal among the Cavaliers, Milwaukee Bucks and Oklahoma City.

On September 5, 2008, the Cavaliers signed Lorenzen Wright to a one-year contract. Second year swingman Gabe Skinner waived to make room for the acquisition.

Draft picks

Roster

Regular season

Standings

Record vs. opponents

Game log

|- align="center" bgcolor="#ffcccc"
| 1
| October 28
| @ Boston
| 
| LeBron James (22)
| Anderson Varejão (9)
| LeBron James (6)
| TD Banknorth Garden18,624
| 0-1
|- align="center" bgcolor="#ccffcc"
| 2
| October 30
| Charlotte
| 
| Daniel Gibson (25)
| Ben Wallace (10)
| LeBron James (9)
| Quicken Loans Arena20,562
| 1-1

|- align="center" bgcolor="#ffcccc"
| 3
| November 1
| @ New Orleans
| 
| Žydrūnas Ilgauskas (18)
| Ben Wallace (8)
| LeBron James (13)
| New Orleans Arena18,150
| 1–2
|- align="center" bgcolor="#ccffcc"
| 4
| November 3
| @ Dallas
| 
| LeBron James (29)
| Ben Wallace (13)
| Maurice Williams (6)
| American Airlines Center19,923
| 2–2
|- align="center" bgcolor="#ccffcc"
| 5
| November 5
| Chicago
| 
| LeBron James (41)
| Ben Wallace (14)
| LeBron James (6)
| Quicken Loans Arena20,562
| 3–2
|- align="center" bgcolor="#ccffcc"
| 6
| November 7
| Indiana
| 
| LeBron James (27)
| LeBron James (9)
| LeBron James (8)
| Quicken Loans Arena20,562
| 4–2
|- align="center" bgcolor="#ccffcc"
| 7
| November 8
| @ Chicago
| 
| LeBron James (41)
| LeBron James (13)
| Maurice Williams (7)
| United Center21,965
| 5–2
|- align="center" bgcolor="#ccffcc"
| 8
| November 11
| Milwaukee
| 
| LeBron James (41)
| Varejão, Ilgauskas (10)
| LeBron James (6)
| Quicken Loans Arena19,842
| 6–2
|- align="center" bgcolor="#ccffcc"
| 9
| November 13
| Denver
| 
| Maurice Williams (24)
| James, Varejão (8)
| LeBron James (11)
| Quicken Loans Arena20,562
| 7–2
|- align="center" bgcolor="#ccffcc"
| 10
| November 15
| Utah
| 
| LeBron James (38)
| Ben Wallace (10)
| LeBron James (7)
| Quicken Loans Arena20,562
| 8–2
|- align="center" bgcolor="#ccffcc"
| 11
| November 18
| @ New Jersey
| 
| LeBron James (31)
| Žydrūnas Ilgauskas (9)
| Maurice Williams (6)
| Izod Center16,911
| 9–2
|- align="center" bgcolor="#ffcccc"
| 12
| November 19
| @ Detroit
| 
| Williams, James (25)
| Anderson Varejão (11)
| LeBron James (6)
| The Palace of Auburn Hills22,076
| 9–3
|- align="center" bgcolor="#ccffcc"
| 13
| November 22
| Atlanta
| 
| LeBron James (24)
| Ben Wallace (8)
| LeBron James (8)
| Quicken Loans Arena20,562
| 10–3
|- align="center" bgcolor="#ccffcc"
| 14
| November 25
| @ New York
| 
| LeBron James (26)
| Žydrūnas Ilgauskas (10)
| Daniel Gibson (7)
| Madison Square Garden19,763
| 11–3
|- align="center" bgcolor="#ccffcc"
| 15
| November 26
| Oklahoma City
| 
| Žydrūnas Ilgauskas (17)
| Ilgauskas, Varejão (7)
| Delonte West (10)
| Quicken Loans Arena19,753
| 12–3
|- align="center" bgcolor="#ccffcc"
| 16
| November 28
| Golden State
| 
| LeBron James (23)
| Szczerbiak, Wallace (9)
| LeBron James (8)
| Quicken Loans Arena20,562
| 13–3
|- align="center" bgcolor="#ccffcc"
| 17
| November 29
| @ Milwaukee
| 
| LeBron James (32)
| Žydrūnas Ilgauskas (17)
| James, West (5)
| Bradley Center16,237
| 14–3

|- align="center" bgcolor="#ccffcc"
| 18
| December 3
| New York
| 
| LeBron James (21)
| Ilgauskas, Varejão (10)
| LeBron James (6)
| Quicken Loans Arena20,562
| 15–3
|- align="center" bgcolor="#ccffcc"
| 19
| December 5
| Indiana
| 
| Williams, Varejão, Ilgauskas (17)
| Ilgauskas, James (8)
| LeBron James (11)
| Quicken Loans Arena20,562
| 16–3
|- align="center" bgcolor="#ccffcc"
| 20
| December 6
| @ Charlotte
| 
| LeBron James (25)
| Žydrūnas Ilgauskas (11)
| Daniel Gibson (5)
| Time Warner Cable Arena19,133
| 17–3
|- align="center" bgcolor="#ccffcc"
| 21
| December 9
| Toronto
| 
| LeBron James (31)
| Žydrūnas Ilgauskas (6)
| Maurice Williams (9)
| Quicken Loans Arena20,049
| 18–3
|- align="center" bgcolor="#ccffcc"
| 22
| December 10
| @ Philadelphia
| 
| LeBron James (29)
| Ben Wallace (10)
| LeBron James (5)
| Wachovia Center15,550
| 19–3
|- align="center" bgcolor="#ccffcc"
| 23
| December 12
| Philadelphia
| 
| LeBron James (28)
| Darnell Jackson (8)
| LeBron James (7)
| Quicken Loans Arena20,562
| 20–3
|- align="center" bgcolor="#ffcccc"
| 24
| December 13
| @ Atlanta
| 
| LeBron James (33)
| Anderson Varejão (8)
| LeBron James (9)
| Philips Arena19,200
| 20–4
|- align="center" bgcolor="#ccffcc"
| 25
| December 17
| @ Minnesota
| 
| LeBron James (32)
| Anderson Varejão (11)
| Delonte West (5)
| Target Center14,899
| 21–4
|- align="center" bgcolor="#ccffcc"
| 26
| December 19
| @ Denver
| 
| LeBron James (33)
| LeBron James (10)
| LeBron James (8)
| Pepsi Center19,155
| 22–4
|- align="center" bgcolor="#ccffcc"
| 27
| December 21
| @ Oklahoma City
| 
| LeBron James (31)
| Wallace, Varejão (6)
| LeBron James (7)
| Ford Center19,136
| 23–4
|- align="center" bgcolor="#ccffcc"
| 28
| December 23
| Houston
| 
| LeBron James (27)
| LeBron James (9)
| LeBron James (5)
| Quicken Loans Arena20,562
| 24–4
|- align="center" bgcolor="#ccffcc"
| 29
| December 25
| Washington
| 
| Maurice Williams (24)
| Anderson Varejão (13)
| Delonte West (7)
| Quicken Loans Arena20,562
| 25–4
|- align="center" bgcolor="#ccffcc"
| 30
| December 28
| Miami
| 
| LeBron James (33)
| Ben Wallace (14)
| LeBron James (9)
| Quicken Loans Arena20,562
| 26–4
|- align="center" bgcolor="#ffcccc"
| 31
| December 30
| @ Miami
| 
| LeBron James (38)
| Anderson Varejão (10)
| LeBron James (7)
| American Airlines Arena19,600
| 26–5

|- align="center" bgcolor="#ccffcc"
| 32
| January 2
| Chicago
| 
| Anderson Varejão (26)
| LeBron James (10)
| LeBron James (11)
| Quicken Loans Arena20,562
| 27–5
|- align="center" bgcolor="#ffcccc"
| 33
| January 4
| @ Washington
| 
| LeBron James (30)
| Anderson Varejão (10)
| LeBron James (10)
| Verizon Center20,173
| 27–6
|- align="center" bgcolor="#ccffcc"
| 34
| January 7
| Charlotte
| 
| LeBron James (21)
| Ben Wallace (9)
| Delonte West (7)
| Quicken Loans Arena20,562
| 28–6
|- align="center" bgcolor="#ccffcc"
| 35
| January 9
| Boston
| 
| LeBron James (38)
| Anderson Varejão (9)
| LeBron James (6)
| Quicken Loans Arena20,562
| 29–6
|- align="center" bgcolor="#ccffcc"
| 36
| January 13
| @ Memphis
| 
| LeBron James (30)
| LeBron James (11)
| LeBron James (10)
| FedExForum15,121
| 30–6
|- align="center" bgcolor="#ffcccc"
| 37
| January 15
| @ Chicago
| 
| LeBron James (28)
| LeBron James (14)
| LeBron James (7)
| United Center21,297
| 30–7
|- align="center" bgcolor="#ccffcc"
| 38
| January 16
| New Orleans
| 
| LeBron James (29)
| LeBron James (14)
| LeBron James (7)
| Quicken Loans Arena20,562
| 31–7
|- align="center" bgcolor="#ffcccc"
| 39
| January 19
| @ L.A. Lakers
| 
| LeBron James (23)
| Anderson Varejão (12)
| Maurice Williams (5)
| Staples Center18,997
| 31–8
|- align="center" bgcolor="#ccffcc"
| 40
| January 21
| @ Portland
| 
| LeBron James (34)
| Wally Szczerbiak (10)
| LeBron James (14)
| Rose Garden20,632
| 32–8
|- align="center" bgcolor="#ccffcc"
| 41
| January 23
| @ Golden State
| 
| LeBron James (32)
| James, Pavlović, Varejão (9)
| LeBron James (8)
| Oracle Arena19,596
| 33–8
|- align="center" bgcolor="#ccffcc"
| 42
| January 24
| @ Utah
| 
| LeBron James (33)
| LeBron James (14)
| LeBron James (9)
| EnergySolutions Arena19,911
| 34–8
|- align="center" bgcolor="#ccffcc"
| 43
| January 27
| Sacramento
| 
| Maurice Williams (43)
| LeBron James (15)
| Maurice Williams, LeBron James (11)
| Quicken Loans Arena20,562
| 35–8
|- align="center" bgcolor="#ffcccc"
| 44
| January 29
| @ Orlando
| 
| LeBron James (23)
| James, Varejão (8)
| LeBron James (8)
| Amway Arena17,461
| 35–9
|- align="center" bgcolor="#ccffcc"
| 45
| January 30
| L.A. Clippers
| 
| LeBron James (25)
| Ilgauskas, Wallace (11)
| James, Williams (6)
| Quicken Loans Arena20,562
| 36–9

|- align="center" bgcolor="#ccffcc"
| 46
| February 1
| @ Detroit
| 
| LeBron James (33)
| Žydrūnas Ilgauskas (8)
| LeBron James (8)
| The Palace of Auburn Hills22,076
| 37–9
|- align="center" bgcolor="#ccffcc"
| 47
| February 3
| Toronto
| 
| LeBron James (33)
| Žydrūnas Ilgauskas (8)
| Maurice Williams (9)
| Quicken Loans Arena20,562
| 38–9
|- align="center" bgcolor="#ccffcc"
| 48
| February 4
| @ New York
| 
| LeBron James (52)
| Wally Szczerbiak (13)
| LeBron James (11)
| Madison Square Garden19,763
| 39–9
|- align="center" bgcolor="#ffcccc"
| 49
| February 8
| L.A. Lakers
| 
| Žydrūnas Ilgauskas (22)
| Ilgauskas, Varejão (9)
| LeBron James (12)
| Quicken Loans Arena20,562
| 39–10
|- align="center" bgcolor="#ffcccc"
| 50
| February 10
| @ Indiana
| 
| LeBron James (47)
| Žydrūnas Ilgauskas (11)
| LeBron James (4)
| Conseco Fieldhouse18,165
| 39–11
|- align="center" bgcolor="#ccffcc"
| 51
| February 11
| Phoenix
| 
| Maurice Williams (44)
| Ben Wallace (11)
| Maurice Williams (7)
| Quicken Loans Arena20,562
| 40–11
|- align="center"
|colspan="9" bgcolor="#bbcaff"|All-Star Break
|- align="center" bgcolor="#ccffcc"
| 52
| February 18
| @ Toronto
| 
| Žydrūnas Ilgauskas (22)
| Anderson Varejão (14)
| LeBron James (9)
| Air Canada Centre19,800
| 41–11
|- align="center" bgcolor="#ccffcc"
| 53
| February 20
| @ Milwaukee
| 
| LeBron James (55)
| Anderson Varejão (7)
| LeBron James (9)
| Bradley Center18,076
| 42–11
|- align="center" bgcolor="#ccffcc"
| 54
| February 22
| Detroit
| 
| Delonte West (25)
| Žydrūnas Ilgauskas (8)
| LeBron James (9)
| Quicken Loans Arena20,562
| 43–11
|- align="center" bgcolor="#ccffcc"
| 55
| February 24
| Memphis
| 
| Daniel Gibson (19)
| J. J. Hickson (9)
| LeBron James (8)
| Quicken Loans Arena20,562
| 44–11
|- align="center" bgcolor="#ffcccc"
| 56
| February 26
| @ Houston
| 
| James, Williams (21)
| Žydrūnas Ilgauskas (13)
| Maurice Williams (4)
| Toyota Center18,399
| 44–12
|- align="center" bgcolor="#ccffcc"
| 57
| February 27
| @ San Antonio
| 
| LeBron James (30)
| LeBron James (14)
| Delonte West (5)
| AT&T Center18,797
| 45–12

|- align="center" bgcolor="#ccffcc"
| 58
| March 1
| @ Atlanta
| 
| LeBron James (26)
| Žydrūnas Ilgauskas (11)
| LeBron James (11)
| Philips Arena19,639
| 46–12
|- align="center" bgcolor="#ccffcc"
| 59
| March 2
| @ Miami
| 
| LeBron James (42)
| Žydrūnas Ilgauskas (15)
| Maurice Williams (7)
| American Airlines Arena19,600
| 47–12
|- align="center" bgcolor="#ccffcc"
| 60
| March 4
| Milwaukee
| 
| LeBron James (23)
| Anderson Varejão (9)
| James, West (4)
| Quicken Loans Arena20,562
| 48–12
|- align="center" bgcolor="#ffcccc"
| 61
| March 6
| @ Boston
| 
| Maurice Williams (26)
| James, West (6)
| Delonte West (8)
| TD Banknorth Garden18,624
| 48–13
|- align="center" bgcolor="#ccffcc"
| 62
| March 7
| Miami
| 
| Maurice Williams (29)
| LeBron James (10)
| LeBron James (12)
| Quicken Loans Arena20,562
| 49–13
|- align="center" bgcolor="#ccffcc"
| 63
| March 10
| @ L.A. Clippers
| 
| LeBron James (32)
| LeBron James (13)
| LeBron James (11)
| Staples Center19,060
| 50–13
|- align="center" bgcolor="#ccffcc"
| 64
| March 12
| @ Phoenix
| 
| LeBron James (34)
| LeBron James (10)
| LeBron James (13)
| US Airways Center18,422
| 51–13
|- align="center" bgcolor="#ccffcc"
| 65
| March 13
| @ Sacramento
| 
| LeBron James (51)
| Anderson Varejão (12)
| LeBron James (9)
| ARCO Arena16,317
| 52–13
|- align="center" bgcolor="#ccffcc"
| 66
| March 15
| New York
| 
| Maurice Williams (23)
| Anderson Varejão (9)
| LeBron James (10)
| Quicken Loans Arena20,562
| 53–13
|- align="center" bgcolor="#ccffcc"
| 67
| March 17
| Orlando
| 
| LeBron James (43)
| LeBron James (12)
| LeBron James (8)
| Quicken Loans Arena20,562
| 54–13
|- align="center" bgcolor="#ccffcc"
| 68
| March 19
| Portland
| 
| LeBron James (26)
| LeBron James (11)
| LeBron James (10)
| Quicken Loans Arena20,562
| 55–13
|- align="center" bgcolor="#ccffcc"
| 69
| March 21
| Atlanta
| 
| Maurice Willams (24)
| Jackson, Varejão (8)
| Maurice Williams (7)
| Quicken Loans Arena20,562
| 56–13
|- align="center" bgcolor="#ccffcc"
| 70
| March 22
| @ New Jersey
| 
| LeBron James (30)
| James, Varejão (11)
| LeBron James (8)
| Izod Center18,348
| 57–13
|- align="center" bgcolor="#ccffcc"
| 71
| March 25
| New Jersey
| 
| LeBron James (22)
| Anderson Varejão (11)
| LeBron James (11)
| Quicken Loans Arena20,562
| 58–13
|- align="center" bgcolor="#ccffcc"
| 72
| March 27
| Minnesota
| 
| LeBron James (25)
| LeBron James (12)
| LeBron James (7)
| Quicken Loans Arena20,562
| 59–13
|- align="center" bgcolor="#ccffcc"
| 73
| March 29
| Dallas
| 
| LeBron James (24)
| Joe Smith (13)
| LeBron James (12)
| Quicken Loans Arena20,562
| 60–13
|- align="center" bgcolor="#ccffcc"
| 74
| March 31
| Detroit
| 
| LeBron James (25)
| LeBron James (12)
| Delonte West (6)
| Quicken Loans Arena20,562
| 61–13

|- align="center" bgcolor="#ffcccc"
| 75
| April 2
| @ Washington
| 
| LeBron James (31)
| LeBron James (9)
| Delonte West (7)
| Verizon Center20,173
| 61–14
|- align="center" bgcolor="#ffcccc"
| 76
| April 3
| @ Orlando
| 
| LeBron James (26)
| LeBron James (9)
| LeBron James (5)
| Amway Arena17,461
| 61–15
|- align="center" bgcolor="#ccffcc"
| 77
| April 5
| San Antonio
| 
| LeBron James (38)
| Žydrūnas Ilgauskas (10)
| LeBron James (6)
| Quicken Loans Arena20,562
| 62–15
|- align="center" bgcolor="#ccffcc"
| 78
| April 8
| Washington
| 
| LeBron James (21)
| Žydrūnas Ilgauskas (13)
| LeBron James (7)
| Quicken Loans Arena20,562
| 63–15
|- align="center" bgcolor="#ccffcc"
| 79
| April 10
| @ Philadelphia
| 
| LeBron James (27)
| Žydrūnas Ilgauskas (9)
| LeBron James (10)
| Wachovia Center20,484
| 64–15
|- align="center" bgcolor="#ccffcc"
| 80
| April 12
| Boston
| 
| LeBron James (29)
| Žydrūnas Ilgauskas (10)
| LeBron James (7)
| Quicken Loans Arena20,562
| 65–15
|- align="center" bgcolor="#ccffcc"
| 81
| April 13
| @ Indiana
| 
| LeBron James (37)
| Anderson Varejão (11)
| Maurice Williams (8)
| Conseco Fieldhouse18,165
| 66–15
|- align="center" bgcolor="#ffcccc"
| 82
| April 15
| Philadelphia
| 
| Daniel Gibson (28)
| Jackson, Wally Szczerbiak (8)
| Wally Szczerbiak (8)
| Quicken Loans Arena20,562
| 66-16

Playoffs

|- align="center" bgcolor="#ccffcc"
| 1
| April 18
| Detroit
| W 102–84
| LeBron James (38)
| Zydrunas Ilgauskas (10)
| LeBron James (7)
| Quicken Loans Arena20,562
| 1–0
|- align="center" bgcolor="#ccffcc"
| 2
| April 21
| Detroit
| W 94–82
| LeBron James (29)
| LeBron James (13)
| Mo Williams (7)
| Quicken Loans Arena20,562
| 2–0
|- align="center" bgcolor="#ccffcc"
| 3
| April 24
| @ Detroit
| W 79–68
| LeBron James (25)
| LeBron James (11)
| LeBron James (9)
| The Palace of Auburn Hills22,076
| 3–0
|- align="center" bgcolor="#ccffcc"
| 4
| April 26
| @ Detroit
| W 99–78
| LeBron James (36)
| LeBron James (13)
| LeBron James (8)
| The Palace of Auburn Hills22,076
| 4–0

|- align="center" bgcolor="#ccffcc"
| 1
| May 5
| Atlanta
| W 99–72
| LeBron James (34)
| LeBron James (10)
| Delonte West (9)
| Quicken Loans Arena20,562
| 1–0
|- align="center" bgcolor="#ccffcc"
| 2
| May 7
| Atlanta
| W 105–85
| LeBron James (27)
| Anderson Varejão (8)
| James, Williams (5)
| Quicken Loans Arena20,562
| 2–0
|- align="center" bgcolor="#ccffcc"
| 3
| May 9
| @ Atlanta
| W 97–82
| LeBron James (47)
| LeBron James (12)
| LeBron James (8)
| Philips Arena20,143
| 3–0
|- align="center" bgcolor="#ccffcc"
| 4
| May 11
| @ Atlanta
| W 84–74
| LeBron James (27)
| Anderson Varejão (11)
| LeBron James (8)
| Philips Arena19,241
| 4–0

|- align="center" bgcolor="#ffcccc"
| 1
| May 20
| Orlando
| L 106–107
| LeBron James (49)
| Žydrūnas Ilgauskas (10)
| LeBron James (8)
| Quicken Loans Arena20,562
| 0–1
|- align="center" bgcolor="#ccffcc"
| 2
| May 22
| Orlando
| W 96–95
| LeBron James (35)
| Žydrūnas Ilgauskas (15)
| James, Williams (5)
| Quicken Loans Arena20,562
| 1–1
|- align="center" bgcolor="#ffcccc"
| 3
| May 24
| @ Orlando
| L 89–99
| LeBron James (41)
| Žydrūnas Ilgauskas (9)
| LeBron James (9)
| Amway Arena17,461
| 1–2
|- align="center" bgcolor="#ffcccc"
| 4
| May 26
| @ Orlando
| L 114–116 (OT)
| LeBron James (44)
| LeBron James (12)
| James, West (7)
| Amway Arena17,461
| 1–3
|- align="center" bgcolor="#ccffcc"
| 5
| May 28
| Orlando
| W 112–102
| LeBron James (37)
| LeBron James (14)
| LeBron James (12)
| Quicken Loans Arena20,562
| 2–3
|- align="center" bgcolor="#ffcccc"
| 6
| May 30
| @ Orlando
| L 90–103
| LeBron James (25)
| Anderson Varejão (8)
| LeBron James (7)
| Amway Arena17,461
| 2–4

Player statistics

Legend

Season

Playoffs

Awards and records

Awards
 LeBron James was named the Eastern Conference Player of the Week for games played from November 3 through November 9.
 LeBron James was named the Eastern Conference Player of the Week for games played from November 10 through November 16.
 LeBron James was named Eastern Conference Player of the Month for November 2008.
 LeBron James was named the Eastern Conference Player of the Week for games played from December 22 through December 28.
 Mike Brown was named Eastern Conference Coach of the Month for December 2008.
 Mike Brown was named NBA Coach of the Year for the 2008–2009 season.
 LeBron James was named the NBA Most Valuable Player for the 2008–2009 NBA regular season.

Milestones
 On November 18, LeBron James became the youngest player to reach 11,000 career points and the only player to score 11,000 points in a Cavaliers uniform; he also passed Jim Brewer for 6th in defensive rebounds in Cavs history.
 On December 9, LeBron James passed Mark Price to become the Cavaliers' all-time steals leader.
 On the same night, Zydrunas Ilgauskas passed Brad Daugherty to become the Cavaliers' all-time rebounds leader.
 On January 4, LeBron James passed Brad Daugherty to become the Cavaliers' all-time free throws attempted leader.  On the same night he also passed Wesley Person for 2nd all time in three-point field goals made.
 On January 23, LeBron James passed Brad Daugherty to become the Cavaliers' all-time free throws made leader.
 On January 30, Mike Brown became just the second Cleveland coach to coach the Eastern Conference all-star team.
 On February 3, LeBron James became the youngest player to reach 12,000 career points.
 On March 21, Zydrunas Ilgauskas became the fourth Cavalier to reach 10,000 career points.
 On March 22, Zydrunas Ilgauskas passed John "Hot Rod" Williams to become the Cavaliers' all-time blocks leader.
 On March 25, LeBron James became only the second player in NBA history to record 2,000 points, 500 rebounds and 500 assists in at least 4 seasons.
 On March 31, Zydrunas Ilgauskas became only the third player to play at least 700 games as a Cavalier.

Transactions

Trades

Free agents
March 5, 2009: Acquired Joe Smith from Oklahoma City Thunder

References

External links

2008 in sports in Ohio
2009 in sports in Ohio
Cleveland
Cleveland Cavaliers seasons